The 1985 duschfrisch Trophy ADAC 1000 km was the fifth round of the 1985 World Endurance Championship. It took place at the Hockenheimring, West Germany on July 14, 1985.

Official results
Class winners are in bold. Cars failing to complete 75% of the winner's distance marked as Not Classified (NC).

Statistics
 Pole Position - #1 Rothmans Porsche - 1:55.18
 Fastest Lap - #19 Brun Motorsport - 2:00.66
 Average Speed - 185.607 km/h

References

 
 

Hockenheim
Hockenheim